Tuidraki is Fijian surname. Notable people with the surname include:

Aisea Tuidraki (1916–1966), Fijian cricketer 
Patiliai Tuidraki (1969–2002), Fijian rugby union player

Fijian-language surnames